Josephine Grace Brand  (born 23 July 1957) is an English comedian, writer, presenter and actress. Starting her entertainment career with a move from psychiatric nursing to the alternative comedy stand-up scene and early performances on Saturday Live, she went on to appear on The Brain Drain, Channel 4's Jo Brand Through the Cakehole, Getting On and various television appearances including as a regular guest on QI, Have I Got News for You and Would I Lie to You?. She also makes regular appearances on BBC Radio 4 in programmes such as The News Quiz and Just a Minute. Since 2014 she has been the presenter of The Great British Bake Off: An Extra Slice. In 2003, Brand was listed in The Observer as one of the 50 funniest acts in British comedy.

Early life
Brand was born in Clapham, London, near St Paul's Church in a house which was "a little terraced Victorian place on the Wandsworth Road with an outside toilet", and grew up in Hastings, East Sussex. Her mother was a social worker at Charing Cross Hospital and her father was a structural engineer. Her father suffered from depression from the age of 12, until he was successfully treated with antidepressants in his mid-50s. Her parents separated when she was a teenager. Brand is the middle of three children, with two brothers. When she was about four, the family moved to the village of St Mary's Platt near Sevenoaks in Kent, and a year later, to Benenden. Brand was educated at St Mary's Platt Primary School, Benenden Village Primary School, Tunbridge Wells Girls' Grammar School until the age of 16, Hastings High School for Girls and Bexhill College.

After working in a pub, for Barnardo's, and as a nursing assistant in a residential unit for adults with learning disabilities she took a joint social science degree with a Registered Mental Nurse qualification at Brunel University. She then worked as a psychiatric nurse for ten years, at the South London Bethlem hospital, Cefn Coed Hospital in Swansea and Maudsley Hospital in south London.

Career

Comedy
When Brand began her career in comedy, she used the stage name the "Sea Monster". She was part of the British alternative comedy movement, working in London alternative comedy clubs in the mid-1980s, and appearing initially on the Saturday Live television show. She shared a flat with fellow comic and comedy club owner Ivor Dembina.

Brand's early style involved her delivering jokes in a bored monotone, one line at a time, with pauses in between. It drew heavily from pop culture and the media, with many jokes containing references to celebrities and public figures. Brand has said that she drank heavily before her first gig, was heckled throughout, and received no applause at the end of the set. Her Doc Marten boots, large size and short hair led to false rumours that she was a lesbian.

In 2007, Brand narrated Laughter & Tears: The Les Dawson Story, a documentary tribute to Les Dawson, which was broadcast on BBC Radio 2 in October 2007.

In 2010, Brand took part in Channel 4's Comedy Gala, a benefit show held in aid of Great Ormond Street Children's Hospital, filmed live at the O2 Arena in London on 30 March.

Brand played the Demon Dinner Lady in the British live-action film Horrid Henry: The Movie (2011). She also provided a voice-over for the Lyric, Hammersmith Theatre's 2011 pantomime Aladdin.

In August 2015, Brand judged the first ever Class Clowns competition at the Edinburgh Festival Fringe, she also announced the winner at the Gilded Balloon on the night.

Brand has written a feature-film adaptation of her novel The More You Ignore Me. She will also star in the film.

Television
In 1993, Brand became a resident panellist, along with Tony Hawks, on BBC monologue show The Brain Drain. Her transition into mainstream television continued when she starred in her own series on Channel 4, Jo Brand Through the Cakehole, co-written with comedy writer Jim Miller, who was already her main stand-up writer. Brand has had several solo television series, and presented shows such as Jo Brand's Commercial Breakdown. She had a cameo appearance in an episode of Absolutely Fabulous entitled "New Best Friend" (1994), and also appeared on Star Spell, a spin-off from Hard Spell in 2004.

Her television success continued with guest appearances on shows such as Have I Got News for You and QI, to the extent where she became the most frequently appearing guest on the latter, appearing in a total of 34 episodes. As a fan of Countdown, Brand achieved an ambition when she was invited to appear in the show's "Dictionary Corner" as the celebrity guest. She later became a friend of the host, Richard Whiteley, and after his death in 2005 attended his memorial service at York Minster. She has appeared on Countdown as a Dictionary Corner guest 88 times.

In 2004, Brand appeared in a special episode of What Not to Wear, where fashion gurus Trinny Woodall and Susannah Constantine gave her a makeover.

On 25 March 2007, Brand appeared on Play It Again, where she was required to learn how to play the organ in just four months. This was in preparation to perform Johann Sebastian Bach's Toccata and Fugue in D Minor for an audience of 8,000 people at London's Royal Albert Hall on the second largest pipe organ in the United Kingdom. In order to practise her performance, she played "Dear Lord and Father of Mankind", a favourite hymn of hers at a church service in her former village church in Benenden, Kent, and accompanied dancers at Blackpool Tower. Prior to this, her only experiences with musical instruments had been childhood piano and violin lessons.

Brand took part in the first celebrity version of Comic Relief Does Fame Academy. In 2007 she appeared as a celebrity contestant on Comic Relief Does The Apprentice. In 2009 she participated in Let's Dance for Comic Relief, another Comic Relief fundraiser, dancing as Britney Spears, reaching the final. She has also been a judge on the show. In January 2013 Brand took part in a special Comic Relief series of The Great British Bake Off.

Brand has been a fill-in host on The Paul O'Grady Show and The One Show. Brand co-created, co-wrote and co-starred in the BBC Four sitcom Getting On opposite Joanna Scanlan and Vicki Pepperdine, for which she won the 2011 Best TV Comedy Actress BAFTA award. The series, directed by Peter Capaldi and Susan Tully, is a gritty and realistic satire on the current state of the NHS, set in a geriatric ward.

In April 2009 Brand was as a judge with John Amaechi and Jeremy Stockwell on the BBC Two series The Speaker, charting the search for "Britain's Best Young Speaker".

In 2011, Brand presented Jo Brand's Big Splash, a television programme where she performed a stand-up routine and visited people with a love of water and it was produced by her production company, What Larks! Productions.

In January 2013 and 2014, Brand was a judge, with Andy Banks and Leon Taylor, on the ITV show Splash! .

On 14 January 2014, Brand presented an episode of The Great Sport Relief Bake Off on BBC Two, a charity version of The Great British Bake Off. In February 2015 she also presented an episode of The Great Comic Relief Bake Off.

Brand is the presenter of The Great British Bake Off: An Extra Slice, which premiered on 8 August 2014. A second series aired from August 2015, third from August 2016 and a fourth from August 2017.

In 2014, Brand co-wrote and starred as Rose in a comedy pilot for Sky Arts called Damned. The show was commissioned for a full series by Channel 4, airing in 2016; its second series aired in 2018.

Since 2017, she has presented the Channel 5 series Jo Brand's Cats & Kittens. The show is available in the United States on Netflix as Kitten Rescuers.

On 28 January 2019, the BBC television series Imagine, presented by Alan Yentob, documented Jo's life and career, with contributions from many of her comedy peers, in a programme titled Jo Brand:  No Holds Barred.

In 2019, Brand became a contestant on Taskmaster.

Brand appeared in BBC's Antique Roadshow: Nursing Special (which aired on Sunday 26th February 2023) talking to Fiona Bruce about her time as a psychiatric nurse. Brand spoke about her experience working in emergency mental health clinics, as well lighter moments performing in hospital pantos.

Personal life

Brand married Bernie Bourke, a psychiatric nurse, in 1997 in Shropshire. They have two daughters, Maisie Bourke and Eliza Bourke; Maisie performs under the name "Maisi", and cofounded the "Loud LDN" collective of female and non-binary creatives, which counts among its members piri, Venbee and Caity Baser. Her husband and two daughters are all vegetarian, but Brand prefers to "pursue pork-pies in service stations when no-one is looking."

Brand delivered a guest lecture on the subject of psychiatric nursing for the University of Derby Psychology Society in 1997 in return for a donation to Derby Rape Crisis. Also in 1997, she opened at Lambeth Hospital in South London, the first major exhibition of the Adamson Collection since the death of Edward Adamson, the pioneer of Art Therapy, in 1996.

In February 2009, Brand was among a group of British entertainers who wrote an open letter to The Times of London in support of the leaders of the Baháʼí Faith who were then on trial in Iran.

Charity

Brand is a supporter of the charity ActionAid and has taken part in fundraising events for the organisation.

In November 2014, Brand was a part of Gareth Malone's All Star Choir, who released a cover version of "Wake Me Up" to raise money for the BBC's Children in Need.

On 28 January 2016, Brand completed a 150-mile walk across Britain, in aid of Sport Relief, in Liverpool. Brand crossed the finish line at the Albert Dock at 7.30pm, having set off from the banks of the River Humber on 22 January. Her efforts were shown in a 60-minute documentary, which aired on 17 March 2016, called Jo Brand's Hell of a Walk for Sport Relief.

Brand is a patron of the National Self Harm Network (NSHN), International Animal Rescue, and the Prader-Willi Syndrome Association, as well as London Nightline. She is the president of the Ectopic Pregnancy Trust.

Brand is an ambassador for the Alzheimer's Society.

Politics
Brand is a staunch supporter of the Labour Party. She was still a contributor to and supporter of the party in 2012.

Brand introduced and spoke at the celebration of Michael Foot's life at London's Lyric Theatre, Shaftesbury Avenue, on 8 November 2010. She is also a republican. In January 2012, she gave the South Shields annual lecture at Harton Technology College alongside the Member of Parliament (MP) for the town, David Miliband.

In August 2014, Brand was one of 200 public figures who were signatories to a letter to The Guardian opposing Scottish independence in the run-up to September's referendum on that issue.

Brand is a supporter of the Women's Equality Party.

In June 2019, Brand was featured in the BBC Radio 4 comedy show Heresy, after a number of right-wing and far-right European election candidates had been doused with milkshakes during campaign walkabouts the previous month. Brand said "Why bother with a milkshake when you could get some battery acid?" She later added: "That’s just me, sorry, I’m not gonna do it, it’s purely a fantasy, but I think milk shakes are pathetic, I honestly do. Sorry." The BBC later defended Brand, explaining "the jokes made on Heresy are deliberately provocative as the title implies" and that they were "not intended to be taken seriously." The Prime Minister at the time, Theresa May, said the BBC should explain why a joke about throwing battery acid was "appropriate content" for broadcast and the BBC later announced that the remark would be edited out of any future broadcasts. The Metropolitan Police confirmed that it had "received an allegation of incitement to violence that was reported to the MPS on 13 June". and that they were investigating the matter. Appearing at an event in Henley, Oxfordshire, on the same day, the comedian was said to have apologised for making the joke, saying "Looking back it probably was somewhat a crass and ill-judged joke that might upset people." It was understood that the allegation reported to the police was not made by Nigel Farage or the Brexit Party. Ofcom said it has received 65 complaints about the episode of Heresy. The police dropped the investigation two days later. On 29 August 2019, the BBC's Executive Complaints Unit (ECU) partially upheld complaints about the joke, saying: 'Whilst the ECU recognised that the wider message from this episode is an argument for more civility in political discourse, not less, and Ms Brand's contribution is not intended to be taken as face value, the ECU felt that it went beyond what was appropriate for the show.'

In a 2018 interview, Brand recalled an incident where she was forcibly kissed by a financial trader during a charity event in Canary Wharf, commenting that she chose not to report the incident because  ‘it would ruin the day and I was worried no one would believe me’.

Awards and honours
On 17 July 2007 Brand was awarded an honorary doctorate for her work as a psychiatric nurse from the University of Glamorgan (now the University of South Wales). Professor Donna Mead, Dean of the School of Health, Sport and Science, who read Brand up for the award commented, "Jo incorporates much of her experience working in the field of mental health into her current work as a comedian. This has increased awareness of the work done by nurses in the mental health field. She has also used her experiences of working with individuals with conditions such as Alzheimer's to promote awareness of and raise funds for the Alzheimer's Society."

In December 2007 she received a Journal of Psychiatric and Mental Health Nursing Lifetime Achievement Award, an award associated with the Eileen Skellern Memorial Lecture. At this event she was praised for making mental health nursing more visible to the general public.

In January 2014, Brand was awarded a second honorary doctorate from Canterbury Christ Church University, for her work in raising awareness of mental health issues and challenging the stigma surrounding such illnesses.

Bibliography
 Novels
 Mental (with Helen Griffin. HTV Sherman Plays series. Cardiff: Drama Association of Wales, 1996). 
 Sorting Out Billy (novel. London: Review, 2004). 
 It's Different for Girls (novel. London: Headline Review, 2005). 
 The More You Ignore Me (novel. London: Headline Review, 2009). 

 Autobiographies
 Look Back in Hunger. The Autobiography (London: Headline Review, 2009). 
 Can't Stand Up For Sitting Down. The Autobiography – Part 2 (London: Headline Review, 2010). 

 Non fiction
 A Load of Old Balls: Men in History (London: Simon & Schuster, 1994). 
 A Load of Old Ball Crunchers: Women in History (London: Simon & Schuster, 1996).

Filmography
Television

Film

Stand-up Releases
 A Big Slice of Jo Brand VHS (1994)
 Through the Cakehole VHS (1996), DVD (2006)
 Brand New CD (1997)
 Live Again CD (2001)
 Barely Live DVD (2003)
 Jo Brand Live CD (2006)
 A Load of Old Balls CD (2007)

Awards and nominations
 British Comedy Award 1992: Top comedy club performer
 British Comedy Award 1995: Best stand-up comic
 British Comedy Award 2010: Best female TV comic
 BAFTA 2011: Best Female Performance in a Comedy Role
 British Comedy Award 2012: Best female TV comic

References

External links

 
 Jo Brand: Me? Singing? I couldn't get arrested? Interview by Jasper Rees, The Telegraph, 30 January 2008.
 Keep on running: Jo Brand Interview by Tarquin Cooper, The Telegraph, 9 April 2005.
 Article about Brand's career for TV show The Speaker, BBC website
 BBC Interview by Matt Stadlen – Five Minutes With: Jo Brand (2009-08-14)

1957 births
Living people
20th-century English comedians
20th-century English actresses
21st-century English comedians
21st-century English actresses
21st-century English women writers
Actresses from Kent
Actresses from London
Alumni of Brunel University London
Best Female Comedy Performance BAFTA Award (television) winners
BBC people
British feminists
British socialist feminists
British socialists
Comedians from London
English autobiographers
English non-fiction writers
Nurses from London
English stand-up comedians
English television actresses
English television presenters
English television writers
English women comedians
Fellows of King's College London
English feminist writers
Labour Party (UK) people
People educated at Tunbridge Wells Girls' Grammar School
People from Hastings
People from Clapham
Psychiatric nurses
English socialists
English socialist feminists
British republicans
Women's Equality Party people
British women television writers